The Country Music Association Awards, also known as the CMA Awards or CMAs, are presented to country music artists and broadcasters to recognize outstanding achievement in the country music industry. The televised annual presentation ceremony features performances and award presentations by popular country music artists, with occasional appearances from pop and rock artists. The CMA Awards were first presented in 1967, and televised for the first time the following year.

History
The first CMA awards were presented at an untelevised ceremony at the Nashville Municipal Auditorium in 1967; the Entertainer of the Year award that night went to Eddy Arnold. The second annual CMA awards were presented in October 1968; NBC taped the ceremony and televised it a few weeks later. Since then, the awards have been televised live, usually in October or November, by NBC from 1969 through 1971, by CBS from 1972 through 2005, and by ABC beginning in 2006. Starting in 1968 they were held at Nashville's Grand Ole Opry (initially at Ryman Auditorium, and from 1974 through 2004 at the new Grand Ole Opry House).

In 2005, the awards show was held at Madison Square Garden in New York City. Since 2006, they have been held at Nashville's Bridgestone Arena. In 2020, due to the COVID-19 pandemic, the 54th CMA Awards were held at Nashville's Music City Center.

Since 2017, the ceremony was held on the second Wednesday of November. Prior to 2017, the awards were generally held on the first Wednesday of November.  However, since then the awards have been rescheduled for later in the month to avoid conflict with a possible game seven of Major League Baseball's World Series, since the 2016 ceremony aired the same night as Fox’s eventual telecast of game seven of the 2016 Series, which beat the CMA Awards in the ratings.

In June 2021, the Country Music Association announced that they would extend its broadcast contract with ABC through 2026.

Following the COVID-19 Pandemic, the Country Music Association announced that the 55th CMA Awards on November 10, 2021, would require ticketed audience members to be fully vaccinated against COVID-19 and to wear appropriate face coverings.

Eligibility and voting
Albums and songs released between July 1 of the previous calendar year and June 30 of the award show's year are eligible for consideration. More than 7,300 individuals from the Country Music Association trade group vote for the nominees and winners through three rounds of balloting.

Awards
Annual awards are given in the following twelve categories: Entertainer, Male Vocalist, Female Vocalist, New Artist (previously known as the Horizon Award until 2008), Vocal Group, Vocal Duo (introduced in 1970), Single, Album, Song, Musical Event (split off from the Vocal Duo award in 1988 as Vocal Event), Music Video (introduced in 1985), and Musician. The distinction between the Duo and Event awards is that the former is presented to two artists who normally perform together, while the latter was specifically created to honor one-off collaborations. Nine awards are also given to radio broadcasters for Station of the Year and Personality of the Year (divided into four categories each, based on market size), as well as National Personality of the Year to the host of a nationally syndicated show. Since 2012, the ceremony features a Lifetime Achievement Award. Vince Gill, and Alan Jackson are the only individuals to win Entertainer of the Year, Male/Female Vocalist of the Year or Group/Duo of the Year, Album of the Year, and Song of the Year all in the same year.

Categories

Entertainer of the Year
Male Vocalist of the Year
Female Vocalist of the Year
Vocal Group of the Year
Vocal Duo of the Year
New Artist of the Year
Musician of the Year
Album of the Year
Single of the Year
Song of the Year
Musical Event of the Year
Video of the Year
Lifetime Achievement Award
International Achievement Award

Defunct categories
Comedian of the Year (1967-1970)
Instrumental Group of the Year (1967-1986)

Radio awards

National Personality of the Year
Major Market Personality of the Year
Large Market Personality of the Year
Medium Market Personality of the Year
Small Market Personality of the Year
Major Market Station of the Year
Large Market Station of the Year
Medium Market Station of the Year
Small Market Station of the Year

Major awards

Country Music Association Award for International Achievement 
The Country Music Association Award for International Achievement is presented to international artists and executives.

International Artist Achievement Award
Formerly presented as the International Touring Artist Award, this award recognizes outstanding achievement by a U.S.-based artist who has demonstrated the most significant creative growth, development and promotion of the country music industry outside of the United States during the eligibility period. The Dixie Chicks were the first artists to receive the award twice. 2008 is the only year in which there were multiple winners.

2022: Ashley McBryde
2021: Luke Combs
2020: Keith Urban
2019: Kacey Musgraves
2018: Little Big Town
2017: Carrie Underwood
2016: Kacey Musgraves
2015: Not presented
2014: Brad Paisley
2013: Taylor Swift
2012: Lady Antebellum
2011: Brad Paisley
2010: Not presented
2009: Taylor Swift
2008: Dierks Bentley and Brooks & Dunn
2007: Dwight Yoakam
2006: Dixie Chicks
2005: Keith Urban
2004: Dolly Parton
2003: Dixie Chicks
2002: Bellamy Brothers
2001: Lonestar
2000: Reba McEntire
1999: Shania Twain
1998: Trisha Yearwood
1997: The Mavericks
1996: BR5 49

Global Country Achievement Award
Named in honor of Jeff Walker, this award recognizes outstanding achievements by a country music artist signed outside of the United States. The artist must have furthered the popularity of country music as well as brought attention to the country music format in their territory. This award was first presented in 2003 and has been presented annually since, with the exception of 2015. The Global Country Achievement Award has been most frequently won by Australian artists.

2021: The Shires (UK)
2020: Ilse DeLange (The Netherlands)
2019: Travis Collins (Australia) and Ward Thomas (UK)
2018: Dean Brody (Canada)
2017: The Shires (UK)
2016: Gord Bamford (Canada)
2015: Not presented
2014: Morgan Evans (Australia)
2013: Gord Bamford (Canada)
2012: Jasmine Rae (Australia)
2011: The McClymonts (Australia)
2010: Tommy Emmanuel (Australia)
2009: Catherine Britt (Australia)
2008: Troy Cassar-Daley (Australia)
2007: Adam Harvey (Australia)
2006: Jason McCoy (Canada)
2005: Paul Brandt (Canada)
2004: Kasey Chambers and Slim Dusty (Australia)
2003: Lee Kernaghan (Australia)

International Broadcaster of the Year
This award recognizes outstanding achievement by a radio broadcaster outside the United States who has made important contributions for the development of country music in their country. Up to three recipients may be named in any year. Each recipient must represent a different territory. 

2021: Baylen Leonard (UK)
2020: Ben Earle (UK)
2019: Baylen Leonard (UK)
2018: Chris Stevens (UK)
2017: Bob Harris (UK)
2016: Paul McGuire (Canada)
2015: Not presented
2014: Ricky Ross (UK)
2013: Bob Harris (UK)
2012: David Burton (Australia), Takehisa Matsuda (Japan) and Lee Williams (UK)
2011: Ken McLeod (Scotland), Felicity Urquhart (Australia) and Brian D'Arcy (Northern Ireland)
2010: Sandy Harsch (Ireland), Larry Cann (Australia) and Alan Watkiss (UK)
2009: Grant Goldman (Australia), Casey Clarke (Canada) and Brian Clough (UK)
2008: Pio McCann (Ireland), John Bond (Australia) and Joe Fish (UK)
2007: Nick Erby (Australia), Jackie-Rae Greening (Canada) and Georges Lang (France)
2006: Tim Rogers (UK), Ian Holland (Australia) and Helen Macpherson (Scotland)
2005: The Odd Squad (Canada), Ray Hadley (Australia) and Bryan Burnett (Scotland)
2004: Trevor Campbell (UK), Bob Harris (UK) and Nikos Garavelas (Greece)
2003: Pat Geary (Scotland), Johnnie Walker (UK) and John Laws (Australia)
2002: Stuart Cameron and David Allan (UK)
2001: Gary Beattie (Australia) and Bill Black (UK)
2000: Thomas Jeier (Germany), Korneliusz Pacuda (Poland), John Nutting (Australia) and Dick Barrie (Scotland)
1999: Trevor Smith (Australia), Dieter Vulpus and Bernd Schroeder (Germany), Country FM (The Netherlands)
1998: Ruud Hermans and Jan de Jong (The Netherlands), Lloyd Cole (Wales) and Kirsten Helm Petersen (Denmark)
1997: Walter Fuchs (Germany), Nick Erby and John Laws (Australia)

CMA Awards hosts

The first ceremony in 1967, which was not televised, was co-hosted by Sonny James and Bobbie Gentry. Vince Gill hosted the awards from 1992 to 2003. Brad Paisley and Carrie Underwood have co-hosted the ceremonies from 2008 to 2018. For the 2019 ceremony, Carrie Underwood  hosted alongside Reba McEntire and Dolly Parton. McEntire returned to host the 2020 ceremony with Darius Rucker. Luke Bryan hosted the 2021 show solo. Bryan returned to host the 2022 ceremony with Peyton Manning.

Award milestones

Most wins

Most nominated

Won four main awards in single year 
Only two artists have won the top four awards in a single year: Entertainer of the Year, Album of the Year, Male Vocalist/Female Vocalist/Group/Duo of the Year and Song of the Year: Vince Gill, in 1993 and Alan Jackson, in 2002.

Controversies

Charlie Rich "lights up" John Denver
When presenting the Entertainer of the Year award at the 1975 ceremony, Charlie Rich, who appeared to be intoxicated after drinking backstage and was allegedly taking pain medication for a broken foot, opened the envelope to reveal the winner. When he saw that John Denver had been chosen, Rich pulled out his lighter and burned the envelope, sarcastically declaring that the winner was "my friend, Mr. John Denver". Many saw Rich's actions as a protest towards pop artists crossing over into country music and it remains one of the most talked about moments in CMA history.

Kathy Mattea's AIDS speech
During a time when the rest of the entertainment industry were wearing red ribbons to signify solidarity and promote awareness of the AIDS epidemic, in an attempt to steer clear of controversy, the CMA instead encouraged guests to wear green ribbons to signify environmental awareness. This did not sit well with Kathy Mattea, who had lost several friends to the disease, and she requested the CMA's help in drafting a short speech on the issue but they ignored her request and she took matters into her own hands. At the 1992 ceremony while presenting an award, Mattea wore three red ribbons and one green one and announced the names of her friends who had passed and delivered an impassioned speech that created a discussion and elevated AIDS awareness among the Nashville community. Mattea went on to become a staunch advocate for the cause, releasing the album Red Hot + Country two years later to raise funds for AIDS charities.

Alan Jackson's 1999 performance
On May 8, 1999, George Jones released "Choices", a song written by Mike Curtis and Billy Yates, that featured an accompanying music video which depicted his struggles with substance abuse. The song subsequently became a Top 30 hit for Jones and was nominated for Single of the Year at the 1999 CMA Awards, with the CMA inviting him to perform a shortened version at the ceremony. Jones felt insulted that the CMA requested he remove part of the song and so he passed on the invitation. Alan Jackson, who was slated to perform his current single "Pop a Top", was offended that the CMA had denied Jones the opportunity to sing the full song and so, during his performance, he stopped his own band mid-song and instead sang a chorus of "Choices", which went on to earn a standing ovation from the crowd.

Dixie Chicks 50th anniversary performance
At the 50th CMA Awards in 2016, the Dixie Chicks returned the CMA stage for the first time since their comments about George Bush resulted in them being blacklisted from the industry. They were joined by Beyoncé to perform a medley of "Daddy Lessons" from her 2016 Lemonade album and their own 2002 hit "Long Time Gone". While many viewers and critics praised the performance, it garnered criticism from some country traditionalists, who stated that Beyoncé, a pop/R&B artist had no place at a country music awards show. The comments polarized opinions, with some noting that they could be seen as a racist attack, as previous collaborations with non-country artists had not received the same amount of criticism and some suggesting that old grudges against the Dixie Chicks had fueled the extreme responses to their performance. Many artists including Dierks Bentley and Karen Fairchild defended the performance while others did not, including Alan Jackson who reportedly walked out of the arena.

See also
 Inductees of the Country Music Hall of Fame
 CMA Music Festival, a CMA-produced summer event which is part of the CMA broadcast contract with ABC

References

External links
Official site

 
American music awards
Awards established in 1967
1967 establishments in Tennessee